Peachtree Presbyterian Church is a megachurch located in Atlanta, Georgia.  Peachtree averages about 3200 in weekly worship at two venues on both sides of Roswell Road in the Buckhead region of Atlanta, and is one of the largest Presbyterian congregations in the United States of America.

History 
Peachtree began as a Sunday school for children in Atlanta founded in 1910. The church itself was chartered on November 3, 1919.
The original church was a gray granite building built in 1926 at the corner of Peachtree Road and Mathieson Drive.

In September 1999 the church opened a large, modern recreation center which includes two basketball courts.
The Gym at Peachtree offers a range of fitness and recreational programs, which the church sees as an integral part of the ministry.

By 1992 the church had the largest Presbyterian congregation in the US. The senior pastor at the time, Rev. W. Frank Harrington, grew the church from fewer than 3,000 members in 1971 to more than 11,000 at the time of his death in 1999. In 1992, Rev. Harrington was runner-up in the election for moderator of the then-2.9-million-member denomination.
In 2000 Dr. Victor D. Pentz became Senior Pastor.
Pentz, from Southern California, had varied experience before joining Peachtree, including a chaplaincy to the crew of three Space Shuttle launches at Cape Canaveral, running an evangelistic beach ministry to Southern California surfers and speaking at conferences around the world.

Pentz and Peachtree are considered conservatives within the theological spectrum of the PC (USA); Pentz and several other leaders of evangelical PC (USA) churches have proposed setting up alternate structures for conservative congregations if a proposed amendment to the denomination's Book of Order passes permitting ordination of anyone other than practicing heterosexuals.

In 2012, Peachtree initiated an annual antique car show to raise awareness and funds for a life insurance program benefitting members of the Atlanta police department. The program, which began in 2005 following the death of APD Officer Mark Cross, funds the gift of a $100,000 life insurance policy to every officer of the Atlanta police department. The policy covers both on-duty officers, and those working a second job in their capacity as a police officer.

Over three Septembers from 2010 to 2012, members raised funds to buy the ingredients for more than one million meals for starving children, at 19 cents a meal, which they prepared and packed for delivery to Haiti.

Pentz retired in May 2016. He was succeeded by Dr. Richard Kannwischer, who had previously served as Lead Pastor of St. Andrew’s Presbyterian Church in Newport Beach, California.

See also
List of the largest churches in the US
Oglethorpe Presbyterian Church

References

Presbyterian megachurches in the United States
Megachurches in Georgia
Presbyterian churches in Atlanta
Christian organizations established in 1910
Presbyterian Church (USA) churches